In Russian historiography the term Upper Oka Principalities ( - literally: "Upper Principalities") traditionally applies to about a dozen tiny and ephemeral polities situated along the upper course of the Oka River at the turn of the 14th and 15th centuries. Nowadays, the areas concerned lie within the bounds of the Tula Oblast, Kaluga Oblast, Oryol Oblast and Bryansk Oblast of Russia.

Following the Mongol invasion of Russia of 1223-1240, the formerly mighty Principality of Chernigov gradually degenerated to a point where the descendants of Mikhail of Chernigov  (c. 1185 – 1246) ruled dozens of quasi-sovereign entities. As the principalities were wedged in between the ever-expanding Grand Duchy of Lithuania to the west and the nascent Grand Duchy of Muscovy to the north, their rulers were constricted to continually fluctuate between these two major powers as buffer states.

By the end of the 14th century, they were obliged to pay annual tribute to Lithuania. The strengthening alliance of Lithuanian rulers with Roman Catholic Poland caused shifts in the balance of power in the region. Most  Orthodox rulers of the Upper Principalities, therefore, started to look to Moscow for protection against Lithuanian expansionism. Towards the end of the 15th century, most of these princelings had moved to the Muscovite court. In 1494 Lithuania finally renounced her claims to the region.

The list of principalities (in order of seniority)

Belyov - the seat of Princes Belyovsky (1468-1588)
Vorotynsk - the seat of Princes Vorotynsky, retained by them as an appanage until the Oprichnina
Mosalsk - the seat of Princes Mosalsky
Zvenigorod-on-the-Oka - the seat of Princes Zvenigorodsky and Nozdrevaty
Karachev - the seat of Princes Khotetovsky
Kozelsk and Peremyshl - the seats of Princes Gorchakov
Tarusa and Meshchevsk (now Meshchovsk) - the seats of Princes Mezetsky with their cadet branches of Teterin, Shcherbatov

Boryatino - the seat of Princes Boryatinsky
Obolensk - the seat of Princes Obolensky with their cadet branches of Repnin, Lykov, Dolgorukov, Shcherbatov, etc.

References
Lubawski M.K. Regional Division and Local Administration in the Lithuanian-Russian State. Moscow, 1892.
Bazilewicz K.V. Foreign Affairs of the Russian Centralized State. Moscow, 1952.

Historical regions in Russia
Former principalities
States and territories established in the 14th century